Iakob Apkhazava (born 30 May 1991) is a Georgian professional footballer who plays for FC Tbilisi City.

References

External links
 
 Profile at pressball.by
 

1991 births
Living people
Footballers from Georgia (country)
Association football forwards
Expatriate footballers from Georgia (country)
Expatriate footballers in Belarus
Expatriate footballers in Spain
Cultural Leonesa footballers
FC Lokomotivi Tbilisi players
FC Kolkheti-1913 Poti players
FC Slavia Mozyr players
FC Sioni Bolnisi players